Pinkava (Czech/Slovak feminine: Pinkavová) is a surname. Notable people with the surname include:

 Donald John Pinkava (1933–2017), American botanist
 Jan Pinkava (born 1963), Czech filmmaker
 Jaromir Pinkava, Czech Paralympic volleyball player
 Václav Pinkava (1926–1995), real name of Jan Křesadlo, Czech psychologist and writer

See also
 

Czech-language surnames
Slovak-language surnames